Pot de crème, plural pots de crème (pronounced the same), is a loose French dessert custard dating to the 17th century. The name means "pot of custard" or "pot of cream", which also refers to the porcelain cups in which the dessert is served.

References

French desserts
Custard desserts